Saint-Lazare is a small village of 1,200 people founded in 1849 and is the seat of the Bellechasse Regional County Municipality, part of the Chaudière-Appalaches administrative region. It was chosen as the seat over larger municipalities because it is in the geographical centre of the region.

References

Municipalities in Quebec
Incorporated places in Chaudière-Appalaches